Miss International 2009, the 49th Miss International pageant, was held on November 28, 2009, at the Sichuan International Tennis Center in Chengdu, Sichuan, China. The pageant was originally scheduled to be held on November 7, 2009, at The Venetian Macao in Macau, but the host committee backed out. 65 contestants competed for the coveted title. Alejandra Andreu of Spain crowned Anagabriela Espinoza of Mexico as the new titleholder.

Results

Placements

Special awards

Number of contestants
According to the official website, 73 contestants were expected to attend the pageant, but only 65 contestants showed up to compete for the coveted title.

Contestants from Italy and Suriname withdrew before the pageant started. While, contestants from Guam, Guatemala, Kenya, Sudan, Ukraine withdrew 10 days after the pageant started, only 66 contestants continued at the competition. A day before the grand final, Costa Rica and Nigeria confirmed not arrived at Chengdu, China due both of them had visa problems, marking the number of contestants decreased to 64. Sudan finally arrived at Chengdu to attend the preliminary judging, rehearsals and the grand final with others contestants. The number of contestants finally increased to 65.

Contestants

Notes

Debuts

Returns

Last competed in 2000:
 
Last competed in 2001:
 
Last competed in 2002:
 
Last competed in 2004:
 
Last competed in 2005:
 
Last competed in 2006:
 
 
 
Last competed in 2007:

Withdrawals
Countries who competed last year but not this year:

 
 
 
 
 
 
 
 
 
 
 
 

Contestant withdrew due to compete at Miss World 2009:
  – Zoureena Rijger

Contestants who were confirmed initially but were deleted from the roster of delegates 10 days after the pageant started:
  – Clarissa Damian
  – Angélica Guevara
  – Ludovica Caramis
  –  Diana Nekoye
  – Dariya Ovcharova

Contestants who withdrew due to visa problems:
  – Jennifer Rodriguez
  – Tyme Mbaebie Mba

Replacements
  – Amanda Appleyard
  – Wang Hsuan-Chi
  – Irlia Johnson was replaced by Kenia Andrade
  – Laura Li was replaced by Yvonne Yang
  – Laura Zúñiga gave up her reign as Miss Mexico International and was dethroned as Reina Hispanoamericana 2008.
  – Leslie Bejarano
  – Amanda Díaz
  – Hidaya Maheda
  – Phan Như Thảo

References

External links
 Miss International official site

2009
2009 in China
2009 beauty pageants
Beauty pageants in China